The Bank of Dyersburg is a historic building built in 1885.  Located at 100 N. Main St. in Dyersburg, Tennessee, United States, it has also been known as Citizens Bank Building.  It has served historically in commerce/trade functions, including as a professional building, as a specialty store, and as a financial institution.  It was listed on the National Register of Historic Places in 1983 for its architecture.

The Bank of Dyersburg received a charter and began in business in 1880.  Its 1885 new building has been described as showing "a stylish mix of Second Empire and Italianate architecture."

It is listed in the National Register's NRIS database as showing Modern Movement style, however.

References

Bank buildings on the National Register of Historic Places in Tennessee
Buildings and structures in Dyer County, Tennessee
Commercial buildings completed in 1885
National Register of Historic Places in Dyer County, Tennessee